San Miguel del Puerto  is a town and municipality in Oaxaca in south-western Mexico. The municipality covers an area of 488.6  km². 
It is part of the Pochutla District in the east of the Costa Region. 

As of 2005, the municipality had a total population of 7510.

References

Municipalities of Oaxaca